Imperial Noble Consort Qinggong (12 August 1724 – 21 August 1774), of the Han Chinese Bordered Yellow Banner Lu clan, was a consort of the Qianlong Emperor. She was 13 years his junior. She came from the Lu clan (meaning she was Han Chinese). Although her family was not a very prominent one, Lady Lu rose to Noble Consort in her lifetime.
Imperial Noble Consort Qinggong had no children of her own, but raised Prince Yongyan, the future Jiaqing Emperor.

Life

Family background
Imperial Noble Consort Qinggong's personal name was not recorded in history.

 Father: Shilong
 Four brothers

Yongzheng era
The future Imperial Noble Consort Qinggong was born on the 24th day of the sixth lunar month in the second year of the reign of the Yongzheng Emperor, which translates to 12 August 1724 in the Gregorian calendar.

Qianlong era
It is not known when Lady Lu entered the Forbidden City and was granted the title "First Attendant" by the Qianlong Emperor. She was elevated on 8 May 1748 to "Noble Lady", on 30 July 1751 to "Concubine Qing", and on 4 February 1760 to "Consort Qing".

In 1765, she joined the Qianlong Emperor and his other consorts on an inspection tour to the southern Yangtze delta region. On 14 November 1768, she was elevated to "Noble Consort Qing". She died on 21 August 1774 and was interred in the Yu Mausoleum of the Eastern Qing tombs.

Jiaqing era
On 9 February 1796, the Qianlong Emperor abdicated in favour of his 15th son, Yongyan, and became a Retired Emperor. As the Jiaqing Emperor was raised by Lady Lu in his childhood, he felt grateful to her, so after the Qianlong Emperor died on 7 February 1799, he posthumously elevated her to "Imperial Noble Consort Qinggong".

Titles
 During the reign of the Yongzheng Emperor (r. 1722–1735):
 Lady Lu (from 12 August 1724)
 During the reign of the Qianlong Emperor (r. 1735–1796):
 First Attendant Lu, seventh rank consort
 Noble Lady Lu (from 8 May 1748), sixth rank consort
 Concubine Qing (from 30 July 1751), fifth rank consort
 Consort Qing (from 4 February 1760), fourth rank consort
 Noble Consort Qing (from 14 November 1768), third rank consort
 During the reign of the Jiaqing Emperor (r. 1796–1820):
 Imperial Noble Consort Qinggong (from 8 February 1799), second rank consort

In fiction and popular culture
 Portrayed by Au Oi-ling in The Rise and Fall of Qing Dynasty (1988).
 Portrayed by Yu Yang in Ruyi's Royal Love in the Palace (2018). Her maiden name is Lu Muping. 
 Portrayed by Li Ruoning in Story of Yanxi Palace (2018). Her maiden name is Lu Wanwan.

See also
 Ranks of imperial consorts in China#Qing
 Royal and noble ranks of the Qing dynasty

Notes

References
 
 

1724 births
1774 deaths
Consorts of the Qianlong Emperor